John Campbell Burns (28 January 1880 – 11 June 1941) was a New Zealand cricketer. He played in two first-class matches for Wellington in 1914/15.

See also
 List of Wellington representative cricketers

References

External links
 

1880 births
1941 deaths
New Zealand cricketers
Wellington cricketers
People from Lawrence, New Zealand